Frankie Genovese (25 November 1915 – 19 February 1998) was a Canadian boxer. He competed in the men's lightweight event at the 1932 Summer Olympics.

References

1915 births
1998 deaths
Canadian male boxers
Olympic boxers of Canada
Boxers at the 1932 Summer Olympics
Boxers from Toronto
Lightweight boxers